Regular Old Bogan is an Australian animated sitcom that premiered on 7mate on 26 October 2020. It is created by Mark Nicholson and Sebastian Peart from
Melbourne Production company Stepmates Studios.

The series was added to Tubi in August 2021.

Synopsis

Described as Australia’s answer to South Park, the series will follow the Stubbs family who will encounter outrageous situations from getting lost in the outback, to facing Death Row in a Balinese prison.

Episodes

References

2020 Australian television series debuts
2020s adult animated television series
Australian adult animated comedy television series
English-language television shows
7mate original programming
Television series by Seven Productions
Television controversies in Australia
Animated adult television sitcoms